Eucalyptus mannensis, commonly known as Mann Range mallee, is a species of mallee that is native to Western Australia, South Australian and the Northern Territory. It has rough bark at the base of the trunk, smooth bark above, narrow lance-shaped adult leaves, flower buds in groups of between seven and eleven, creamy white flowers and hemispherical fruit.

Description
It has rough, flaky or fibrous bark on the lower part of the trunk, smooth greyish bark above. Flowering occurs from April to October and the flowers are creamy white.

Taxonomy and naming
Eucalyptus mannensis was first formally described in 1964 by Cliff Boomsma from a specimen collected on Angas Downs Head Station. The description was published in Transactions of the Royal Society of South Australia. The specific epithet (mannensis) refers to the Mann Ranges in South Australia.

In 1992, Lawrie Johnson and Ken Hill described two subspecies and the names have been accepted by the Australian Plant Census:

Distribution and habitat
Mann Range mallee grows on plains and dunes in open shrubland and has a wide distribution in the central ranges of Australia, including in South Australia, the Northern Territory and Western Australia. There are also disjunct populations in the Great Victoria Desert, near Wiluna and near Shark Bay. Subspecies vespertina is restricted to near-coastal areas between the Murchison River and Shark Bay.

Conservation status
Both subspecies of E. mannensis are classified as "not threatened" in Western Australia by the Western Australian Government Department of Parks and Wildlife.

See also
List of Eucalyptus species

References

Eucalypts of Western Australia
mannensis
Myrtales of Australia
Plants described in 1964
Mallees (habit)
Flora of South Australia
Flora of the Northern Territory
Taxa named by Lawrence Alexander Sidney Johnson